Wales is a city in the Nome Census Area, Alaska, United States. At the 2010 census the population was 145, down from 152 in 2000. It is the westernmost city on the North American mainland, although Adak, located on Adak Island, is the westernmost city in Alaska. Wales Airport serves Wales with flights on Bering Air and Ravn Alaska to Nome.

History
A burial mound from the Birnirk culture (CE 500 to 900) was discovered near Wales and is now a National Historic Landmark.

In 1827, a Russian Navy report listed the Inupiat villages of "Eidamoo" near the coast and "King-a-ghe" inland in the area.

In 1890, the American Missionary Association established a mission at the site of present-day Wales. In the 1890s, reindeer (domesticated caribou) were brought to the area and in 1894 a reindeer station was established. Wales became an important whaling center due to its location along whale migratory routes, and it was the region's largest and most prosperous village, with more than 500 residents. Wales is named after the country Wales.

The 1918 flu pandemic decimated the population and economy of Wales.

In 2002 a wind-diesel system became operational.

On November 9, 2011, the city experienced the 2011 Bering Sea superstorm.

On January 17, 2023, a polar bear entered the community of Wales and chased multiple residents. The bear fatally attacked an adult female and juvenile male. It was shot and killed by a local resident as it mauled the pair. This was Alaska’s first reported polar bear attack in over 30 years.

Geography
Wales is located at  (65.612116, −168.089285).

Wales is located on the westernmost point of the American mainland, Cape Prince of Wales, on the western tip of the Seward Peninsula. It is at the northern end of the Continental Divide where the Pacific Ocean and Arctic Ocean meet.

Demographics

Wales first appeared on the 1880 U.S. Census as the unincorporated Inuit village of "Kingigamute." It was returned in 1890 as "Kingaghee." In 1900 and 1910, it was returned as Cape Prince of Wales (Settlements). In 1920, it was shortened to its present name of Wales. It formally incorporated in 1964.

At the 2000 census there were 152 people in 50 households, including 28 families, in the city. There were 59 housing units at an average density of 20.9 per square mile (8.1/km2). The racial makeup of the city was 8.55% White, 0.66% Black or African American, 83.55% (127 people) Native American, 0.66% from other races, and 6.58% from two or more races. Hispanic or Latino of any race were 0.66%.

Of the 50 households 38.0% had children under the age of 18 living with them, 38.0% were married couples living together, 8.0% had a female householder with no husband present, and 44.0% were non-families. 40.0% of households were one person and 6.0% were one person aged 65 or older. The average household size was 3.04 and the average family size was 4.43.

The age distribution was 38.2% under the age of 18, 11.8% from 18 to 24, 25.7% from 25 to 44, 21.1% from 45 to 64, and 3.3% 65 or older. The median age was 26 years. For every 100 females, there were 111.1 males. For every 100 females age 18 and over, there were 141.0 males.

The median household income was $33,333 and the median family income  was $39,583. Males had a median income of $29,375 versus $22,188 for females. The per capita income for the city was $14,877. About 17.2% of families and 18.3% of the population were below the poverty line, including 26.2% of those under the age of 18 and 50.0% of those 65 or over.

Climate
Wales is located within the polar climate zone (Köppen ET).

Education
Wales is served by the Bering Strait School District. Wales School serves grades Pre-K through 12.

References

External links
 Native Village of Wales
 Alaska Division of Community and Regional Affairs: Wales
 Alaska Dispatch: Wales Image Gallery
 Topix: Wales News

Cities in Nome Census Area, Alaska
Populated coastal places in Alaska on the Pacific Ocean
Cities in Alaska
Populated places in the Seward Peninsula